Parallax is an Australian children's television series that screened on the Nine Network. It is a 26-episode series funded by the Film Finance Corporation Australia and supported by Lotterywest. The series was filmed in various locations around Perth. These include Kings Park, East Perth, and many beach and South West forest locations.

The series is about a boy named Ben Johnson, who discovers a portal to multiple parallel universes, and explores them with his friends: Francis Short, Melinda Bruce, Una, Due, Tiffany and Mundi as well as newfound sister, Katherine Raddic.

Cast

Main cast 
 Joshua Marshall-Clarke as Ben Johnson 
 Gillian Alexy as Katherine Raddic 
 Caroline Brazier as Veronica Johnson / Betti
 David Richardson as Francis Short / Francis Zapmeister 
 Francoise Sas as Melinda Bruce
 Kazimir Sas as Martin Dunkly
 Rebecca McCarthy as Fortuna / Una
 Genevieve McCarthy as Due
 Lauren Williams as Mundi
 Luke Hewitt as Jeremy Johnson
 Paris Abbott as Tiffany
 Igor Sas as Stefan Raddic
 David Ngoombujarra as Otto

Guest cast 
 Faith Clayton as Mrs Irma Dawes
 Kristian Barron as Spy Kid

Significant objects and locations 
 Stave
 A kind of baton that most Guardians possess. It has various functions including communication over different worlds to other stave holders, a radio, manipulation of electronic devices and most importantly, the ability to shoot lasers which kill Welkin and Krellicks

 Orb
 A smooth, white sphere. There is one orb for every world whether it be hidden or in possession of the resident Guardian. When not in its original world, if a person with full Guardian blood touches the orb, whatever happened in the world before the removal of the orb will play like a movie on its surface. When the orb is in its original world the person will be transported to the Reading Room thus the orb being its 'keys'. The orbs also act as a defence to the Welkin and Krellicks hiding the blood of a Guardian.

 Reading Room
 The central repository of all knowledge of the Parallax. It keeps records of all the bad and good times of the stories and creatures in the Parallax. Although it is not a control room. The weather can't be changed and an election can't be fixed. Also the central hub of all world transportation.

 Golden Stave
 Only comes into being when a normal stave is taken to the Reading Room. Able to control the "Wheel of Knowledge". Can also manipulate certain times and events to an extent.

 Purple Water
 The key to Betti's blandishment. Betti pours it into the water supply of a world. It reacts with a person who does not fit into the 17.65% personality average of that world and turns them into water vapour. For example if in Hippie World there is a businessman and he drank the purple water he would be blandished.

 Francis Cam
 The form of communication through the Parallax. This is started by Techno World Una and Hippie World Francis. It is a link between four worlds, Techno, Forest, Ben's and Hippie World. The Francises in each world each have a camera with the exception of Techno World which is patrolled by Una. The Francis Cam is used to report Betti sightings, Spy Boy etc.

 Purple eyes
 Betti and Spy Boy's alternate eye colour. Their eyes turn purple when they're not telling the truth or if they're getting angry. Its true purpose is not yet known.

Worlds

Main worlds 
 Ben's World
 The red world, in which the series starts. Could be considered as the "normal" world. Links to Katherine's World through an old drain and Techno World through a chicken shed. When pushing different points on the parallax at the old drain characters can also travel to Forest and Desert Worlds. There is also a portal in Mr Dawes's shed that links to Garden World when the right combination is used (1-1-11).

 Katherine's World
 The blue world, where Ben finds a sister he never knew existed, as well as his biological father. A very formal and organised world with many strict laws. Links to Ben's World via two large rocks and Hippie World by going in between two bookcases at a library. When pushing points on the parallax at the two rocks you can travel to Forest World. There is also a portal on the nearby beach. It leads to the tent owned by Betti in Desert World.

 Francis' Hippie World
 The yellow world. This is a very 'mellow' world filled with Hippies, literally. The only known portal here is through an old Volkswagen Type 2 Kombi van located in front of the house of this world's Francis (A.K.A. The Werrinup Thief), which links to Katherine's World, and Forest World via the right combination.

 Una's Techno World
 The silver world, first thought to be a hi-tech rubbish tip. Everyone lives well and the world is very advanced in technology. The town's motto is "Tomorrow's technology, at yesterday's prices." The portal to get to Ben's World is located at the hi-tech rubbish tip. The other portal is located at an abandoned office building and becomes accessible when a password is typed onto a computer, links to Garden World.

 Mundi's Forest World
 The green world, Ben accidentally stumbles upon this world when he trips onto the Parallax symbol. A world that takes care of its environment, its Werrinup is built on towers above the forest floor to minimise human impact on the eco system. This world is infested by Krellicks and its people are protected through the height of their structures. The tree portal links to Ben's World, Katherine's World, or Techno World, though only when the right combination is hit on the symbol. The rock portal that links to Forest World is located outside of Mrs Dawes house on the forest floor. It is currently though guarded by the Krellicks and used as a nest.

Other worlds 
 Desert World
 The orange world, a lifeless place of sand and stone. Ben's mother sends him to this world as a test. One portal is located over a rock mound and goes to Ben's World via the right combination on the Parallax (7-1). The other portal is at the corner of a tent owned by Betti. It links to Katherine's World. It's later discovered that Desert World is also Otto's original homeworld, before it was destroyed by Betti.

 Garden World
 The pink world, Betti shows Katherine this world as an example of her goal in the Parallax. This world is in its own way perfect, the people who did not fit in have been effectively blandished. One portal is located through a do not enter door, and links to Techno World. The other is at a forked tree and leads to Ben's World.

 Bush World
 The brown world, this is the world in which Otto, the lost guardian has escaped to. Only one portal is known. It is in the middle of a river and links to Forest World. The other portal was meant to be down the river.

 Swamp World
 Only seen briefly when Ben accidentally stumbles into this place via the Reading Room. No portals through this world are known.

Side Doors
There are portals known as Side Doors which are like normal portals but are for singular trips and once you go through it you cannot go through it the way you came out. Ben and Katherine noticed other portal lights when Ben pressed a button on the stave in the Reading Room. They then asked Mrs Dawes if she knew about Side Doors but she sent them to her brother, Mr Dawes. He told them about Side Doors and the condition if you use one. There is only one known Side Door which is Mr Dawes' shed and it links to a seat in Garden World.

Episodes 
 One Big Happy Family
 A Rare Find
 The Artful Dodger
 Achey, Breaky Heart
 Lost in Paradise
 One Man's Rubbish
 Artes Veritas
 The Battle of Mundi's World
 The Big Sleep-Over
 The Martin Crimes
 The World According to Betti (writers: Paul D. Barron (creator), Lynn Bayonas)
 The Curse of the Incredibly Bad News
 Decoy
 Too Many Chiefs
 Ex-Ben
 Dad Meets Dad
 The Krellick War
 The Reluctant Guardian
 Seek and You Shall Find
 Sand Witch
 My Favourite Martin
 Cheats Never Prosper
 Martinmania
 The Reading Room
 Clownin' Around
 It Ain't Over

Home media 
Parallax: The Portal Opens, was released on 4 August 2005. It contains a condensed movie version, taking clips from the first 8 episodes.

References

External links 
 
 
 Parallax at the National Film and Sound Archive

2004 Australian television series debuts
2004 Australian television series endings
Australian adventure television series
Australian children's television series
Australian science fiction television series
Nine Network original programming
Television series about parallel universes
Television shows set in Western Australia